General elections were held in Zambia on 27 December 2001 to elect a President and National Assembly. The result was a victory for the ruling Movement for Multi-Party Democracy, which won 69 of the 150 National Assembly seats and whose candidate, Levy Mwanawasa, won the presidential vote.

The results of the elections were disputed by main opposition parties, including the United Party for National Development, which many observers claimed had won the elections. Both domestic and international election monitors cited serious irregularities with the campaign and election, including vote rigging, flawed voter registration, unequal and biased media coverage, and the MMD's improper use of state resources. In January 2002, three opposition candidates petitioned the Supreme Court to overturn Mwanawasa's victory. While the court agreed that the poll was flawed, it ruled in February 2005 that the irregularities did not affect the results and declined the petition.

Results

President

National Assembly

See also
List of members of the National Assembly of Zambia (2002–06)

References

General election
Elections in Zambia
Zambia
Presidential elections in Zambia
Zambian general election